The 2019 FIBA Under-19 Women's Basketball World Cup (Thai: บาสเกตบอลหญิงชิงแชมป์โลกรุ่นอายุไม่เกิน 19 ปี 2019) (formerly FIBA U19 Women's World Championship) was a tournament organised by FIBA for women's youth national teams aged 19 years old and below and took place in Bangkok, Thailand from 20 to 28 July 2019. Colombia, Germany and Mozambique made their U-19 Women's Basketball World Cup debut.

The United States won their eighth title after defeating Australia in the final in the overtime.

Venue

Qualified teams

Squads

Draw
The draw for the tournament was held on 20 March 2019 in Bangkok, Thailand.

Seedings
The seedings were announced on 19 March 2019.

The following restrictions apply:
 One group will have two European teams, while another will have two Asian teams;
 Japan and Australia drawn in the groups with the USA and Germany;
 Colombia not drawn in the same group as the USA, Argentina and Canada.

Preliminary round
All times are local (UTC+7).

Group A

Group B

Group C

Group D

Knockout stage

Bracket

5–8th place bracket

9–16th place bracket

13–16th place bracket

Round of 16

9–16th place quarterfinals

Quarterfinals

13–16th place semifinals

9–12th place semifinals

5–8th place semifinals

Semifinals

15th place game

13th place game

Eleventh place game

Ninth place game

Seventh place game

Fifth place game

Third place game

Final

Final standings

Statistical leaders

Points

Rebounds

Assists

Blocks

Steals

Awards

References

External links
Official website

2019
2018–19 in Thai basketball
International women's basketball competitions hosted by Thailand
Sport in Bangkok
July 2019 sports events in Asia
2019 in women's basketball
FIBA U19